Telegonus is a genus of skippers in the family Hesperiidae, in which it is placed in subtribe Eudamina. It has been the subject of recent revision, and now includes several species formerly in Astraptes, Autochton and Urbanus.

Species
Recognised species in the genus Telegonus include:
 Telegonus cassander Fabricius, 1793
 Telegonus cassius Evans, [1952]
 Telegonus cellus Boisduval & Le Conte, [1837]
 Telegonus cretellus (Herrich-Schäffer, 1869)
 Telegonus galesus Mabille, 1888
 Telegonus subflavus Grishin, 2022

References

Natural History Museum Lepidoptera genus database

Eudaminae
Hesperiidae genera